Samuel "Sam" Schultz (born December 11, 1985 in Missoula, Montana) is an American cross-country mountain biker.  At the 2012 Summer Olympics, he competed in the Men's cross-country at Hadleigh Farm, finishing in 15th place.

References

American male cyclists
Cross-country mountain bikers
1985 births
Living people
Olympic cyclists of the United States
Cyclists at the 2012 Summer Olympics
Sportspeople from Missoula, Montana
American mountain bikers
Cyclists from Montana